Helü or Helu was King of Wu in ancient China.

Helu may refer to:

 Elu, ancient form of Sinhala language
 Roy Helu, Jr., American football player for the Washington Redskins

See also
 Alfredo Harp Helú, Mexican billionaire
 Carlos Slim Helú, Mexican billionaire